Xugana Airport  is an airstrip serving the Xugana Island Lodge, a safari resort in the Okavango Delta of Botswana.

See also

Transport in Botswana
List of airports in Botswana

References

External links
 OpenStreetMap - Xugana
 OurAirports - Xugana
 Xugana

Airports in Botswana